Hiram Eugene (born November 24, 1980) is a former American football safety in the National Football League (NFL). He was originally signed by the Oakland Raiders as an undrafted free agent in 2006 and played for the team for six seasons. He played college football at Louisiana Tech University.

College career
Eugene attended Louisiana Tech University for two years and was a student and a letterman in football. In football, as a senior, he recorded 29 tackles and a sack.

Oakland Raiders
Eugene went undrafted and signed with the Oakland Raiders in 2006. In 2007, Eugene was named the starter at safety after Stuart Schweigert played ahead.

In 2008, after Michael Huff was benched for poor tackling, Eugene was named the starter.

On March 9, 2011, Eugene signed a four-year contract keeping him with the Raiders. He dislocated his hip in a pre-season game against the Arizona Cardinals and was required to get surgery. As a result, he was then placed on injured reserve and missed the entire 2011 season

With another three years on his contract, the Raiders released Eugene on March 9, 2012.

References

External links
Oakland Raiders bio

1980 births
Living people
Sportspeople from Lafayette, Louisiana
American football safeties
Louisiana Tech Bulldogs football players
Oakland Raiders players